Khalifehabad (also Romanized as Khalīfehābād) is a village in Nurabad Rural District, in the Central District of Delfan County, Lorestan Province, Iran. At the 2006 census, its population was 909, in 169 families.

References 

Towns and villages in Delfan County